Ellenton is an unincorporated community and census-designated place (CDP) in Manatee County, Florida, United States.  The population was 4,129 at the 2020 census. It is part of the Bradenton-Sarasota-Venice, Florida Metropolitan Statistical Area.

History
The oldest structure in Ellenton is the Gamble Plantation, which was built between 1845 and 1850 by Major Robert Gamble. Originally a sugar plantation worked by slaves, the antebellum mansion fell into disrepair after the Civil War. Major George Patten and his wife, Mary, purchased the property in 1870 and named the area "Ellenton" after his daughter Ellen.  In 1881, the United States government designated Ellenton as an official post office site.

A refining plant for fuller's earth located in Ellenton along the Manatee River opened in 1903. It was owned by the Atlantic Refining Company and had 150+ employees being the biggest refinery the company owned. It burned down once in 1908 and again in 1912. In 1922, it burned down for the final time after which it was permanently closed.

Geography
Ellenton is located in central Manatee County at  (27.522666, -82.525867). It is on the north side of the tidal Manatee River and is bordered to the west by the city of Palmetto. Unincorporated Memphis is to the northwest.

U.S. Route 301 passes through the center of the community, and Interstate 75 forms the eastern border, with the highways intersecting at Exit 224 on I-75. US 301 leads west into Palmetto and then south across the Manatee River into Bradenton, the county seat, while to the northeast it leads  to Parrish. I-75 leads north  to the east side of Tampa and south  to Fort Myers.

Demographics

As of the 2020 census, Ellenton had a population of 4,129 people with 1,847 households. There were 2,055 housing units. There was an employment rate of 46.1%. The median household income was $59,723. 11.2% of the population lived below the poverty threshold. 

46.9% of the population 25 years or older had a High School or equivalent degree. 10.5% of the population 25 years and older had a bachelor’s degree or higher.

20.7% of the population spoke Spanish at home, 0.4% spoke other Indo-European languages, and 0.3% spoke Asian and Pacific Islander languages at home. 9.0% of the population were foreign born persons. 28.2% were 65 years or older.

Industry
January 2012 - Feld Entertainment purchased the Palmetto Corporate Center, a former Siemens Corp. complex here and plans to move most of its various operations and its world headquarters there over a five-year period starting with its worldwide production center.

1900 - Fuller's Earth Plant mined clay to be used as bleaching agent and as an absorbent for oil and fat.

1850s to present - Agriculture was an important industry, starting with sugarcane from Gamble Plantation.  This was harvested through slave labor up until the Civil War.  Vegetable farms and citrus groves are also important industries in Ellenton.

References

Census-designated places in Manatee County, Florida
Sarasota metropolitan area
Census-designated places in Florida
Former municipalities in Florida